Luiz Mainzi da Cunha Eça (April 3, 1936 – May 24, 1992) was a samba and bossa nova pianist from Rio de Janeiro, Brazil, who was a member of the Tamba Trio with Helcio Milito and Bebeto Castilho. Trained as a classical pianist, Eça created a formal, but stunning approach to bossa nova classics such as "The Hill" by Antonio Carlos Jobim and works by Edu Lobo. His song "The Dolphin" is considered a jazz standard and has been recorded by Stan Getz, Bill Evans, and Denny Zeitlin. The Tamba 4 group included Otávio Bailly, who replaced Bebeto.

Discography
 Cada Qual Melhor! (Odeon, 1961)
 Rio (Columbia, 1964)
 Bossa Nova for Swingin' Lovers (London Globe, 1965)
 Luiz Eca & Cordas (Philips, 1964)
 Brazil 70 (Philips, 1970)
 Piano e Cordas Volume II (Elenco, 1970)
 Vanguarda (Odeon, 1972)
 Antologia do Piano (Philips, 1976)
 Patapio Silva (Funarte, 1980)
 Luiz Eca (Carmo, 1983)
 Triangulo (Carmo, 1985)
 Pra Tanto Viver (Continental, 1986)
 Ensemble, Duas Suites Instrumentais de Luiz Eca (Cantabile, 1988)
 Encontro Marcado (Line, 1992)
 No Museu de Arte Moderna (Imagem, 1993)

References

1936 births
1992 deaths
Musicians from Rio de Janeiro (city)
20th-century pianists
Bossa nova pianists
Brazilian jazz pianists
A&M Records artists